Tang Yuan (Chinese: 唐渊; born 2 March 1989 in Guiyang, Guizhou) is a Chinese football player.

Club career
In 2008, Tang Yuan started his professional footballer career with Guizhou Zhicheng in the China League Two. On 8 January 2015, Tang moved to Chinese Super League side Guizhou Renhe on a free transfer.  On 17 May 2015, Tang made his debut for Guizhou Renhe in the 2015 Chinese Super League against Shanghai Shenhua, coming on as a substitute for Zhang Chenglin in the 94th minute.

In March 2016, Tang transferred to China League Two side Yinchuan Helanshan. In February 2017, Tang transferred to fellow League Two side Chengdu Qbao.

Career statistics 
Statistics accurate as of match played 31 December 2019.

Honours
Guizhou Hengfeng
China League Two: 2012

References

External links
 

1989 births
Living people
Chinese footballers
Footballers from Dalian
Guizhou F.C. players
Beijing Renhe F.C. players
Chengdu Better City F.C. players
Chinese Super League players
China League One players
China League Two players
Association football defenders